The Cullman County Museum is a local history museum located in downtown Cullman, Alabama, on the corner of Arnold St. and 2nd Ave. N.E. It is housed in a replica of the home of Col. John G. Cullmann, the founder of Cullman. The museum, which opened in 1973 during the town's centennial, collects and preserves items that illustrate life in Cullman's past, including the area's natural history and its Native American and German settlers.

Permanent galleries 
The museum features the following galleries:
Archaeological Room
Primitive Room
Clothing Store
Main Street
Nursery
Music & Photo Gallery
Col. Cullmann's Room
Natural History Room

References

External links
Cullman County Museum - official site

Museums in Cullman County, Alabama
History museums in Alabama